Robert Jackson "RJ" King III is an American male model. He has appeared on the cover of Vogue Italia twice.

Early life
He was born in Columbia, Missouri on April 1, 1992. His sisters Meghan King Edmonds, Julie King, and Caitlin King are also in the entertainment or sports industries.

Career
He is represented by IMG Models. King was discovered at a mall in St. Louis.

King has modeled for Tommy Hilfiger, Michael Kors, Dolce & Gabbana, Uniqlo, Max Mara, Samsung, Armani Exchange, Prada (as an exclusive), Hermès, John Varvatos, Yves Saint Laurent, Louis Vuitton, Moncler, Salvatore Ferragamo, J. Crew, Carven, and Banana Republic, Rag & Bone, Brooks Brothers, and DSquared2 among others. His first job was for i-D magazine. He has also appeared in W and GQ Germany.

References 

1992 births
Living people
People from Columbia, Missouri
People from St. Louis
Gay models
American male models
Male models from Missouri